Edward James Burns (born October 7, 1957) is an American prelate of the Roman Catholic Church who has served as bishop of the Diocese of Dallas in Texas since 2017. He previously served as bishop of the Diocese of Juneau in Alaska from 2009 to 2017.

Before becoming a bishop, Burns spent nine years working for the United States Conference of Catholic Bishops (USCCB).  As bishop, he has served as chair of the Committee on the Protection of Children and Young People and as a member of its Subcommittee on Catholic Home Missions. He speaks Spanish as well as English.

Biography

Early life and education
Edward James Burns was born on October 7, 1957, in Pittsburgh, Pennsylvania, to Donald and Geraldine ( Little) Burns. He has a brother, Robert. He attended Lincoln High School in Ellwood City, Pennsylvania. He then entered Saint Paul Seminary at Duquesne University, obtaining a bachelor's degree in philosophy and sociology.

Burns also earned a Master of Divinity degree and a Master of Theology degree from Mount St. Mary's Seminary at Mount St. Mary's University in Emmitsburg, Maryland.

Ordination and ministry
Burns was ordained to the priesthood for the Diocese of Pittsburgh by Bishop Vincent Leonard on June 25, 1983.  After his ordination, Burns served as parochial vicar at Our Lady of Lourdes Parish in Burgettstown, Pennsylvania and Immaculate Conception Parish in Washington, Pennsylvania. In 1991, Burns was named as vocations director and vice-rector of St. Paul Seminary, becoming its rector in 1996.

Burns served as executive director of the Secretariat for Clergy, Consecrated Life and Vocations in the USCCB for nine years, beginning in 1999. His office produced a DVD titled Fishers of Men, a documentary on the lives of priests. Burns published a booklet, We Were There, that described the experiences of priests who served at the World Trade Center in New York City and the Pentagon after the September 11, 2001 terrorist attacks.

In 2002, Burns was named as co-chair of a Vatican-ordered congress on vocations in North America.  From 2005 to 2006, he provided support for a Vatican review of all Catholic seminaries in the U.S. Burns received the title of monsignor from the Vatican in 2006. In 2008, he returned to his posts as rector of St. Paul Seminary and vocations director for the diocese.

Bishop of Juneau

On January 19, 2009, Pope Benedict XVI appointed Burns as the fifth bishop of the Diocese of Juneau. He received his episcopal consecration on March 3, 2009, at St. Paul Cathedral in Pittsburgh from Bishop David Zubik, with Archbishop Roger Schweitz and Cardinal Donald Wuerl serving as co-consecrators; this was separate from his installation ceremony for the convenience of friends in the Continental United States, because of the distance to Alaska. He chose as his episcopal motto "Pray with Confidence". He was installed in Juneau on April 2, 2009.

Bishop of Dallas
On December 13, 2016, Pope Francis appointed Burns as the eighth bishop of the Diocese of Dallas, to succeed then bishop Kevin Farrell.  His installation was on February 9, 2017, at the Cathedral Shrine of the Virgin of Guadalupe in Dallas.

On August 18, 2018, Burns informed parishioners at St. Cecilia Parish in Dallas that their pastor, Edmundo Paredes, had been removed from ministry in 2017 because of verified allegations of child sexual abuse and the theft of parish funds.  The diocese had immediately reported Paredes to law enforcement, but he fled the country before he could be arrested.

See also

 
 Catholic Church hierarchy
 Catholic Church in the United States
 Historical list of the Catholic bishops of the United States
 List of the Catholic bishops of the United States
 Lists of patriarchs, archbishops, and bishops

References

External links
Roman Catholic Diocese of Dallas Official Site

1957 births
Living people
Catholics from Pennsylvania
Catholics from Texas
Roman Catholic bishops of Juneau
21st-century Roman Catholic bishops in the United States
Religious leaders from Texas
Religious leaders from Pittsburgh
Duquesne University alumni
Mount St. Mary's University alumni